This is a timeline documenting events of Jazz in the year 1932.

Events

 February
 2 – The Duke Ellington Orchestra released the album Moon Over Dixie on the label Brunswick Records.

Standards

Deaths

 March
 1 – Frank Teschemacher, American jazz clarinetist and alto-saxophonist (born 1906).

 May
 20 – James "Bubber" Miley, trumpeter and cornet player, specializing in the use of the plunger mute (born 1903).

 Unknown date
 Virginia Liston, American classic female blues and jazz singer (born 1890).

Births

 January
 1 – Jack Reilly, American pianist (died 2018).
 6 – John Burch, English pianist, composer, and bandleader (died 2006).
 8 – Dick Charlesworth, English clarinettist and saxophonist (died 2008).
 11 – János Gonda, Hungarian pianist (died 2021).
 12 – Hadley Caliman, American saxophone and flute player (died 2010).
 14 – Grady Tate, American drummer and singer (died 2017).
 18 – Irene Kral, American singer (died 1978).
 22 – Teddy Smith, American upright bassist (died 1979).
 31 – Ottilie Patterson, Northern Irish singer (died 2011).

 February
 10
 Roland Hanna, American jazz pianist, composer and teacher (died 2002).
 Walter Perkins, American drummer (died 2004).
 21 – Eddie Higgins, American pianist and composer (died 2009).
 22 – Whitey Mitchell, American bassist (died 2009).
 24 – Michel Legrand, French composer, arranger, conductor, and pianist (died 2019).
 25 – Åke Persson, Swedish trombonist (died 1975).
 28 – Don Francks, Canadian actor and musician (died 2016).

 March
 4 – Miriam Makeba, South African singer (died 2008).
 9 – Keely Smith, American singer (died 2017).
 10 – Shelley Moore, English-born American singer (died 2016).
 11
 Atle Hammer, Norwegian trumpeter (died 2017).
 Leroy Jenkins, American composer and violinist (died 2007).
 14 – Mark Murphy, American singer (died 2015).
 21 – Masaru Imada, Japanese pianist and composer.
 22 – Leo Welch, American guitarist, singer, and songwriter (died 2017).
 23 – Al Aarons, American trumpeter (died 2015).
 24 – Dave MacKay, American pianist and singer (died 2020).

 April
 7 – Rauno Lehtinen, Finnish conductor and composer (died 2006).
 21 – Slide Hampton, American trombonist, composer and arranger.
 25 – Willis Jackson, American tenor saxophonist (died 1987).
 29 – Andy Simpkins, American bassist (died 1999).

 May
 8 – Robin Douglas-Home, Scottish pianist and author (died 1968).
 12 – Walter Wanderley, American organist andpianist (died 1986).
 13 – Harold Rubin, South African-Israeli visual artist and clarinettist.
 15 – John Barnes, English saxophonist and clarinetist.
 17 – David Izenzon, American upright bassist (died 1979).
 20 – Bob Florence, American arranger and pianist (died 2008).
 23 – Les Spann, American guitarist and flautist (died 1989).
 29 – Alan Shorter, American trumpeter and flugelhornist (died 1988).
 31 – Ed Lincoln, Brazilian musician and composer (died 2012).

 June
 2 – Akitoshi Igarashi, Japanese saxophonist.
 4 – Oliver Nelson, American saxophonist and clarinetist (died 1975).
 5 – Pete Jolly, American pianist and accordionist (died 2004).
 7 – Tina Brooks, American tenor saxophonist and composer (died 1974).
 14 – Coleridge-Taylor Perkinson, American composer (died 2004).
 21
 Jamil Nasser, American bassist and tubist (died 2010).
 Lalo Schifrin, Argentine pianist, composer, arranger and conductor.

 July
 6 – Don Wilkerson, American tenor saxophonist (died 1986).
 7 – Joe Zawinul, Austrian-American keyboardist and composer (died 2007).
 16 – John Chilton, British trumpeter and jazz writer (died 2016).

 August
 6 – Dorothy Ashby, American harpist and composer (died 1986).
 16 – Shoji Suzuki, Japanese clarinetist (died 1995).
 17 – Duke Pearson, American pianist and composer (died 1980).
 29
 Ed Bickert, Canadian guitarist (died 2019).
 Jerry Dodgion, American saxophonist and flautist.

 September
 2
 Emil Richards, American vibraphonist percussionist (died 2019).
 Walter Davis Jr., American pianist (died 1990).
 3 – Mickey Roker, American drummer (died 2017).
 8 – Bobby Cole, American singer and pianist (died 1996).
 11 – Ian Hamer, British trumpeter (died 2006).
 13 – Bengt Hallberg, Swedish jazz pianist (died 2013).
 19 – Lol Coxhill, English saxophonist (died 2012).

 October
 13 – Johnny Lytle, American drummer and vibraphonist (died 1995).
 14 – Earl Gill, Irish trumpeter and bandleader (died 2014).
 16 – Ben Aronov, American pianist (died 2015).

 November
 7 – Alvin Batiste, American clarinetist (died 2007).
 10 – Paul Bley, American pianist (died 2016).
 11 – Al Levitt, American drummer (died 1994).
 26 – Kiane Zawadi, American trombone and euphonium player.
 28
 Ethel Ennis, American singer and pianist (died 2019).
 Gato Barbieri, Argentine saxophonist (died 2016).

 December
 2 – Gene Russell, American keyboardist (died 1981).
 3
 Bob Cranshaw, American bassist (died 2016).
 Webster Young, American trumpeter and cornetist (died 2003).
 9 – Donald Byrd, American trumpeter (died 2013).
 15 – Curtis Fuller, American trombonist (died 2021).
 17 – Sonny Red, American alto saxophonist (died 1981).
 22 – Masayuki Takayanagi, Japanese guitarist (died 1991).

References

External links
 History Of Jazz Timeline: 1932 at All About Jazz

Jazz, 1932 In
Jazz by year